Festuca amethystina, also known as the tufted fescue, is a species of grass in the family Poaceae. It is native to Europe, including Turkey.

References 
 GBIF entry
 
 Davis, P. H., ed. 1965–1988. Flora of Turkey and the east Aegean islands.
 Tutin, T. G. et al., eds. 1964–1980. Flora europaea.
 Tzvelev, N. N. 1976. Zlaki SSSR.

amethystina
Bunchgrasses of Europe
Plants described in 1753
Taxa named by Carl Linnaeus